

Theodor Krancke (30 March 1893 – 18 June 1973) was a naval commander (admiral) of Nazi Germany during World War II and a recipient of the Knight's Cross of the Iron Cross with Oak Leaves.

Under the command of Krancke, during the five-month-long raiding cruise, the pocket battleship Admiral Scheer sank 13 merchant ships, one armed merchant cruiser , and captured three merchant ships representing  of Allied and neutral shipping.

During the Allied Invasion of Normandy Krancke, as Commander-in-Chief of Navy Group Command West headquartered in Paris, controlled all German naval vessels in France, as well as the various land-based naval units and the naval coastal artillery and anti-aircraft batteries along the French Atlantic coast.

Dates of Rank
Fähnrich zur See – 12 April 1913
Leutnant zur See – 22 March 1915
Oberleutnant zur See – 25 December 1917
Kapitänleutnant – 1 September 1922
Korvettenkapitän – 1 October 1930
Fregattenkapitän – 1 November 1935
Kapitän zur See – 1 April 1937
Konteradmiral – 1 April 1941
Vizeadmiral – 1 April 1942
Admiral – 1 March 1943

Awards
 Iron Cross (1914) 2nd Class (May 1915) & 1st Class (27 September 1919)
 Sudetenland Medal 1939
 High Seas Fleet Badge 1941
 Clasp to the Iron Cross (1939) 2nd Class (29 October 1939) & 1st Class (20 April 1940)
 Knight's Cross of the Iron Cross with Oak Leaves
 Knight's Cross on 21 February 1941 as Kapitän zur See and commander of heavy cruiser Admiral Scheer
 614th Oak Leaves on 18 October 1944 as Admiral and commander in chief of Marinegruppenkommando West (Navy Group Command West)

References

Citations

Bibliography

 
 

1893 births
1973 deaths
Military personnel from Magdeburg
People from the Province of Saxony
Admirals of the Kriegsmarine
Recipients of the clasp to the Iron Cross, 1st class
Recipients of the Knight's Cross of the Iron Cross with Oak Leaves
Imperial German Navy personnel of World War I
Reichsmarine personnel